Prospekt Metalurhiv is a station on the Kryvyi Rih Metro. Opened on 2 May 1989 as part of the second segment of the second stage. 

The construction is the same standard as the Kharkiv Metro single vault layout, with a provision for the platform to be raised. Decoratively, a large monolithic concrete vault with a series of niches with suspended luminescent chandeliers. Red brickwork and gray marble is used on walls whilst red and gray granite cover the floor. 

The system reaches its deepest point, 22 meters between the two stations, Prospekt Metalurhiv and Budynok Rad.

The station is situated on the intersection between the Metalurhiv avenue and Sobornosti street near the Metalurh Stadium, home ground to FC Kryvbas Kryvyi Rih. The station has two underground vestibules, interconnected with subways.

External links
 Mir Metro - Description and photos
Google maps - Satellite shot.

Kryvyi Rih Metrotram stations